
Year 452 BC was a year of the pre-Julian Roman calendar. At the time, it was known as the Year of the Consulship of Lanatus and Vaticanus (or, less frequently, year 302 Ab urbe condita). The denomination 452 BC for this year has been used since the early medieval period, when the Anno Domini calendar era became the prevalent method in Europe for naming years.

Events

Births

Deaths

References